The Game Changer  is a 2017 Chinese action film directed by Gao Xixi, starring Peter Ho, Huang Zitao, Guli Nazha and Wang Xueqi. Inspired from the television series Shanghai Bund, the film is set in 1930s Shanghai. It was released in China on February 10, 2017 in 2D, 3D and China Film Giant Screen.

Synopsis
Lin Zihao and Fang Jie are two brothers who have gone through life and death with each other. However, Mr. Tang's daughter Tang Qianqian, whom Fang Jie has admired for long, falls in love with Lin Zihao at first sight. At the same time, Lin Zihao finds out that his lover Lan Ruoyun has been captured by Mr. Tang to be his mistress while he was being chased. In order to dominate Shanghai, Mr. Tang has set up a conspiracy, and the most important part of his plan is actually Lin Zihao. However, Mr. Tang does not realize that Lin Zihao's identity is a member of the Blue Shirts Society. The two ultimately go heads on with each other - but who will emerge victorious in this bloody battle?

Cast
Peter Ho as Lin Zihao
Huang Zitao as Fang Jie
Guli Nazha as Tang Qianqian
Wang Xueqi as Tang Hexuan (Mr. Tang) 
Choo Ja-hyun as Lan Ruoyun
Jack Kao 
Long Meizi as Bai Guang

Release
The film has been picked up by Well Go USA and CDC United Network, who will distribute the film in North America, United Kingdom, Australia, New Zealand and Latin America.

Reception
The film grossed CN¥ 5.3 million (US$2,259,054) on its opening weekend. It  grossed CN¥ 101.34 million (US$14,669,320) in China.

References

External links

Chinese action films
2017 action films
Films set in the 1930s
Films set in Shanghai
Chinese 3D films
2017 3D films
Films directed by Gao Xixi
2010s Mandarin-language films